Tropical Storm Isidore was a relatively weak tropical cyclone that passed over most of the Florida Peninsula in late September 1984. The fifteenth tropical cyclone and 9th named storm of the 1984 Atlantic hurricane season. Isidore formed as a tropical depression on September 25, while situated off the southeastern Bahamas. The  depression headed west, and was upgraded to a tropical storm in the central Bahamas the next day. It made landfall near Jupiter, Florida, and retaining tropical storm strength, Isidore curved to the northeast, emerging over water near Jacksonville, Florida. Isidore continued northeast until it was absorbed by a frontal system on October 1. Though damage was generally light, the storm affected several regions from the Bahamas to the U.S. East Coast. One death was reported in Florida, and total damage is estimated at $1 million (1984 USD).

Meteorological history

The storm system that would become Isidore originated in a nearly stationary frontal boundary situated near the Bahamas. However, satellite imagery indicated that convection was just beginning to organize. Satellite imagery and Air Force reconnaissance reports documented the formation of a tropical depression early on September 25; a special statement was later issued by the National Hurricane Center (NHC) confirming the existence of the depression, and tropical cyclone advisories were initiated at 12 pm EDT. The depression moved west-northwest while tracking through the Bahamas. As it did so, it moved across Cat Island and passed near several others. The cyclone attained tropical storm status on September 26, receiving the name "Isidore".

While located near the northern tip of Andros Island, Isidore reached its peak intensity. The barometric pressure fell to 999 mb, with sustained winds of 60 mph (95 km/h). The storm continued moving northwest, though it failed to strengthen significantly over the Florida Current. Previously, a large high pressure area over the eastern United States had prevented the cyclone from moving northward. The high moved away, allowing for Isidore to curve to the northeast, emerging over water near Jacksonville, Florida. Isidore downgraded to a tropical depression on October 1, and was absorbed in a frontal zone later that day. Isidore was one of many storms during the 1984 season that formed in relatively cool baroclinic environments.

Preparations

Due to its mild nature, Isidore was described as a "safety test". Gale warnings were issued from as far south as Key West, Florida, to as far north as Virginia, including parts of Georgia, South Carolina, and North Carolina. A private meteorological service stated that Isidore was to intensify to hurricane status, leading to some confusion regarding preparations. Along the Treasure Coast of Florida, citrus farmers burned seedlings potentially infected with canker to prevent heavy rains from spreading the disease. Red Cross volunteers readied a shelter with supplies such as cots and sheets, though it remained unused. In Martin County, hundreds of firefighters were on standby. In Miami, rain from the storm led to the cancellation of horse races at the Calder Race Course. State parks in Monroe County were temporarily closed.

In Indian River, Martin, and St. Lucie counties, students were sent home early, and after-school actives were canceled. The South Beach Jetty Park in Fort Pierce was closed. In southern portions of the state, residents prepared their boats for the storm, and 50 F-4 Phantom fighter jets were evacuated from the Homestead Air Force Base and moved to bases in South Carolina. Lumber yards, groceries stores, and hardware stores reported unusually high demand for emergency supplies, though certain smaller businesses closed early. Gasoline stations in the region "were doing bumper-to-bumper business". Farther to the south, in the Florida Keys, an emergency operations center was opened in response to the storm.

Impact
In Nassau, Bahamas, Isidore produced flooding rains and gales. There, the storm forced the closure of schools and banks. Heavy precipitation fell throughout the island chain, but no serious damage was reported.

Elsewhere,  winds were recorded. One tornado, ranked F1 on the Fujita scale, touched down near Savannah, Georgia. Power outages were mostly minor and scattered. A large, $500,000 beach restoration fill was washed away. Additionally, segments of State Road A1A were damaged. On Hutchinson Island, many eggs and nests of Caretta caretta and Chelonia mydas, respectively, were destroyed. One man was electrocuted as a result of the storm near Orlando. Another man was injured while attempting to land his plane in high winds. Throughout the state, overall damage was generally insignificant.

The storm also dropped heavy precipitation along the coasts of Georgia, South Carolina, and North Carolina, with sporadic showers in parts of Virginia. Offshore, swells of  extensively damaged a wooden ship, the Phoenix. The vessel "barely escaped destruction", though a crew member suffered a cracked rib. Across its path, Isidore was estimated to have inflicted $1 million in damage.

See also

List of Florida hurricanes
List of Atlantic hurricanes

References

External links
HPC rainfall data
NHC Preliminary Report

Isidore
Isidore (1984)
Isidore (1984)
Isidore (1984)
Isidore (1984)
Isidore